The Jane Doe case is an influential childhood sexual abuse and recovered memory case study published by psychiatrist David Corwin and Erna Olafson (1997). The case was important in regards to repressed and recovered traumatic memories because, being a well-documented study, it had the potential to provide evidence for the existence of the phenomena. The case served as an educational example of childhood sexual abuse and recovered traumatic memory until further investigation by Elizabeth Loftus and Melvin J. Guyer revealed serious concerns about its background and validity. The original article appeared in Child Maltreatment in 1997, accompanied by a series of articles by five additional psychologists and memory experts: Paul Ekman, Stephen Lindsay, Ulrich Neisser, Frank W. Putnam, and Jonathan W. Schooler, giving their own comments and interpretations about the case.

Background

First interviews 

Forensic psychologist David Corwin first interviewed Jane Doe in 1984 at age six, to evaluate sexual and physical abuse claims by her father and stepmother, allegedly committed by Jane's biological mother. At the time of these interviews Jane's parents were going through a custody battle, and both accused each other with wrongdoings such as tax fraud, failing to comply with visitation orders and physical abuse of the children. In the absence of conclusive evidence about these allegations, Corwin was left to decide about their credibility, believing the father's version and discarding the mother's.
Corwin met Jane Doe three times as a child, videotaping the conversations with her, using the tapes and transcriptions as the basis of his analysis and evaluation of the abuse. Six-year-old Jane stated on the videotapes several times that her mother repeatedly abused her, but it was evident that this was not the first time she was asked to talk about what happened, raising the possibility for previous suggestions that could have influenced her. She reported instances of digital penetration while the mother was bathing her, and other physical abuse such as hitting her, pulling her hair, and burning her feet on the stove.
On the basis of these interviews, Corwin concluded that the mother was abusing Jane Doe, and as a result she lost custody over her daughter, including visitation rights.

Second interview 
The second interview took place eleven years later, when Jane Doe was seventeen. After her father and step-mother separated, she lived with her father until he became seriously ill and died. She was now living with a foster mother, and had some relationship with her biological mother. 
 Jane wanted to see the old tapes because she was having trouble remembering what had actually happened. Corwin interviewed her in the presence of the foster mother.
She did not have any memories of the abuse such as the foot-burning episode, but she remembered the interviews and the accusations. However, after further questioning Jane recalled some memories about a single episode in the bathtub, being hurt by her mother. Although still unsure whether her mother intentionally hurt her or not, the memories seemed vivid and powerful. She also recalled accusing her mother of taking pornographic photographs of her and her brother, and selling these. The origin of this recollection was uncertain, as it was not previously documented. Based on the lack of prior documentation, Loftus and Guyer later proposed that the memory was false and induced or suggested by outside sources. During the meeting, Corwin showed the old videotapes to Jane. After watching the tapes, Jane was reluctant to believe that she would have lied as a child, and concluded that her mother must have hurt her.

Interpretations 

Corwin used the videotape and the transcript for educational purposes about childhood sexual abuse since the first interview, with consent given by Jane Doe's father. The second session was later added and consent from Jane was acquired. The recollection about the bathroom episode in the second interview was interpreted by Corwin as a repressed and recovered traumatic memory, and the case-study was published in the May 1997 issue of the quarterly psychological journal Child Maltreatment (CM), the official journal of APSAC. Several other psychologists (Paul Ekman, Stephen Lindsay, Ulrich Neisser, Frank W. Putnam and Jonathan W Schooler) also commented on the case in the journal, mostly in agreement with Corwin's interpretation, and with some criticism from Neisser and Lindsay. After publishing this article, the Jane Doe case became influential, frequently used as an example in psychology and law, as an evidence for the repressed memory phenomenon.

Further research 

Loftus and Guyer, skeptical of Corwin's evidence, conducted extensive research into the case, which involved finding the family through legal databases, as well as talking to friends and relatives. They found additional information that Corwin had omitted, indicating that the full story was more complicated than originally thought. They revealed details about the custody battle between the parents, with the situation eventually leading to the sexual abuse allegations. They also discovered that the marks on Jane's feet and hand, serving basis for the claim that her mother burned her feet on the stove, were probably a result of a previous skin infection that looked ambiguous. They also found a clinical psychologist report, which doubted the sexual abuse at the time, and a documented Child Protection Services investigation, that did not find reason to take action against the mother. In addition, they found evidence of the father being a problem drinker and abusive towards Jane's older brother.

Consequences 

After the research and the interviews with the family members, Loftus and Guyer decided that Jane's mother did not abuse her daughter and that the case was based on false premises. Jane Doe became convinced that the abuse happened, after Corwin showed her the eleven-year-old videotapes. She broke all contact with her biological mother, and complained about invasion of privacy at the University of Washington where Loftus worked as a professor. 
The university started an investigation about the research, which went on for nearly two years hindering the publication of the findings that had great importance for the public. 
When Loftus and Guyer were eventually able to publish the case (2002) in the Skeptical Inquirer magazine, Jane Doe filed a civil suit against Loftus (Taus v. Loftus) and others involved in the research, revealing her real name (Nicole Taus) in the process. Twenty of Taus' twenty-one claims were dismissed as strategic lawsuit against public participation, and in 2007 the lawsuit was largely settled, with just one defendant remaining (Harvey Shapiro, a private investigator who had obtained court records and arranged for the interview with the foster mother).

Conclusion 
The two part articles in the Skeptical Inquirer describing the underlying circumstances of the case presented quite a different picture from the abuse hypothesis published by Corwin in 1997. This alternative explanation was supported by considerable evidence, indicating that Jane Doe was not abused by her mother, and her allegations and "memories" were probably the result of suggestions and coercions from her father and step-mother. Refuting the validity of the Jane Doe case ultimately challenged the repressed and recovered memory hypothesis, which was dominant in psychology for years, including the time when Jane Doe's father and stepmother first accused her biological mother of abuse.

See also 
Repressed memory
False memory syndrome

References 

Child sexual abuse in the United States
Psychiatry controversies